The Bishop of Barrow-in-Furness was an episcopal title used by a suffragan bishop of the Church of England Diocese of Carlisle, in the Province of York, England. The See was created by Order in Council on 6 April 1889 (under the Suffragans Nomination Act 1888) and took its name after the town of Barrow-in-Furness in Cumbria. Since 1944, the title has been in abeyance.

List of bishops

See also

 Barrow-in-Furness
 List of places of worship in Barrow-in-Furness

References

External links
 Crockford's Clerical Directory - Listings

Bishops of Barrow-in-Furness
Barrow-in-Furness
Barrow-in-Furness
Barrow-in-Furness
Barrow-in-Furness